The Bohemian Club is a gentlemen's club in San Francisco, California founded in 1872

Bohemian Club may also refer to:

 Bohemian Club (Chicago), a Czech social club founded in 1899
 Bohemian Football Club, an association football club in Dublin, Ireland
 Bohemian Sporting Club, a former association football club from the Philippines